The Rabigh Dam is a gravity dam on Wadi Rabigh about  east of Rabigh in Makkah Province of western Saudi Arabia. The dam has many purposes to include flood control, municipal water supply and groundwater recharge. Water from the dam's reservoir is treated before being supplied to Rabigh. The dam was constructed between 2003 and 2008. It is owned and operated by the Ministry of Water and Electricity.

See also 

 List of dams in Saudi Arabia

References

Dams completed in 2008
Dams in Saudi Arabia
Mecca Province
Gravity dams